The 2015–16 Eurocup Basketball Last 32 was played from 5 January to 10 February 2016. A total of 32 teams competed in the Last 32 to decide the 16 places in the eighthfinals.

Format

Tiebreakers
If teams are level on record at the end of the Last 32, tiebreakers are applied in the following order:
 Head-to-head record.
 Head-to-head point differential.
 Point differential during the Last 32.
 Points scored during the Last 32.
 Sum of quotients of points scored and points allowed in each Last 32 match.

Groups

Group G

Group H

Group I

Group J

Group K

Group L

Group M

Group N

External links
Official website

2015–16 Eurocup Basketball